eConozco was a Spanish language social networking service aimed at professionals in Spain.

History
Launched in 2003, the site had more than 100,000 users in August 2006.

Grupo Galenicom, the parent company of eConozco, was acquired by XING in March 2007. At that time, the site had 150,000 users.

References

Internet properties established in 2003
Internet properties disestablished in 2007
Defunct social networking services